Sand Hill (sometimes spelled Sandhill) is an unincorporated community in Scotland County, in the U.S. state of Missouri.

History
A post office called Sand Hill was established in 1845, and remained in operation until 1903. The community was so named on account of the sandy soil in the area.

References

Unincorporated communities in Scotland County, Missouri
Unincorporated communities in Missouri